

Mount McIntyre is a locality in the Australian state of South Australia located in the state’s south-east about  south-east of the state capital of Adelaide and about  east of the municipal seat in Millicent.

Mount McIntyre’s boundaries were created on 23 February 1995 for the part within the then District Council of Millicent and on 18 December 1997 within the then District Council of Beachport.  Land from the former locality of Trihi was added on 26 November 2015.  The locality was given the ”long established name” which is derived from Mount McIntyre, a hill located within its boundaries.

Land use within Mount McIntyre is zoned as primary production.

The 2016 Australian census which was conducted in August 2016 reports that Mount McIntyre had a population of 70 people.

Mount McIntyre is located within the federal division of Barker, the state electoral district of MacKillop and the local government area of the Wattle Range Council.

References

 

Towns in South Australia
Limestone Coast